On 3 February 2018, a right-wing terrorist shooting occurred in Macerata, Italy. It received widespread media coverage and affected Italian politics as it occurred during the political campaign for the 2018 Italian general election.

Events
On 3 February 2018, in the city of Macerata, Marche, 28-year-old local Luca Traini, driving a black Alfa Romeo 147 and armed with a 9mm Glock 17 Gen3 semi-automatic pistol, seriously wounded, in a drive-by shooting, six African migrants. Traini also targeted the local headquarters of the ruling Italian Democratic Party. After the attack, Traini reportedly had an Italian flag draped on his shoulders and raised his arm in a fascist salute. 

Traini said the attack was revenge for the murder of Pamela Mastropietro, an 18-year-old local girl whose dismembered body had been found a few days earlier, stuffed into two suitcases and dumped in the countryside. For this, Innocent Oseghale, a 29-year-old Nigerian national and failed asylum seeker, had been arrested and charged.

Aftermath
Traini was a member and former local candidate of Lega Nord (LN), and many political commentators, intellectuals, and politicians criticized the LN's leader Matteo Salvini, accusing him of having spread hate and racism in the country. Anti-mafia writer Roberto Saviano labeled Salvini as the moral instigator of the attack. Salvini responded to critics by accusing the centre-left coalition government of responsibility for Mastropietro's death for allowing migrants to stay in the country and having "blood on their hands", asserting the blame lies with those who "fill us with illegal immigrants". Marco Minniti, then Italian Minister of the Interior, condemned the attack, saying that no political party must "ride the hate".

During the 2019 Christchurch mosque shootings at Al Noor Mosque and Linwood Islamic Centre in Christchurch, New Zealand, Traini's name was written on one of weapon magazines of the perpetrator, Australian Brenton Harrison Tarrant, alongside other far-right mass murderers and killers in addition to historical figures and battles. Tarrant also named Traini as among the shooters and killers that he supported because they "take a stand against ethnic and cultural genocide". Traini dissociated himself from the event, declaring himself to be regretful about what happened in Macerata.

The Prosecutor's Office of Macerata formulated against Traini the accusation of massacre aggravated by the purpose of racism, in addition to other crimes, including unlawful carrying of firearms. On 3 October 2018, Traini was sentenced to 12 years in prison with a summary judgment.

References

2018 crimes in Italy
21st century in Marche
Crime in Marche
February 2018 crimes in Europe
February 2018 events in Italy
Shooting
Neo-fascist attacks in Italy
Terrorist incidents in Italy in 2018
2018 mass shootings in Europe